The external nasal nerve is a terminal branch of the anterior ethmoidal nerve. The trigeminal nerve (CN V) branches into three nerves, one of which is the ophthalmic nerve, which itself has three branches, one of which is the nasociliary nerve. One of the terminal branches of the nasociliary nerve is the anterior ethmoidal nerve. The anterior ethmoidal nerve divides into a lateral nasal branch and medial nasal branch.The medial nasal branch after giving off sensory branches to the anterior and upper parts of the nasal septum, emerges from beneath the inferior nasal margin to form the external nasal nerve. The external nasal nerve provides sensory innervation to the skin of the external nose to the tip.

Axon pathway 

 trigeminal nerve
 ophthalmic nerve
 nasociliary nerve
 anterior ethmoidal nerve
 medial nasal branch of anterior ethmoidal nerve
 external nasal nerve

References 

Ophthalmic nerve
Nose